You and Your Stupid Mate is a 2005 Australian comedy film directed by Marc Gracie and starring Nathan Phillips and Angus Sampson.

Premise
Two best friends who live together in a caravan park discover that their favourite soap opera is about to be cancelled.  They go on a quest to save the show.

Cast
 Nathan Phillips as Philip
 Angus Sampson as Jeffrey
 Rachel Hunter as Karen
 Madeleine West as Emma

Production
The film was one of several comedies with investment from the Macquarie Film Corporation.

Reception
The film was universally panned.

You and Your Stupid Mate grossed $688,491 at the box office in Australia.

See also
 Cinema of Australia

References

External links
 
 

Films shot in Melbourne
Australian buddy comedy films
2000s buddy comedy films
2000s Australian films